The 2020 Pro14 Grand Final was the final match of the 2019–20 Pro14 season. The 2019–20 season was the sixth with Guinness as the title sponsor, the eleventh with a grand final and the third season with 14 teams, following the admission of two Italian teams. The match was planned to be held at Cardiff City Stadium, however, on 19 March 2020, Celtic Rugby DAC cancelled the event due to the COVID-19 pandemic. The re-arranged match took place on 12 September 2020 at the Aviva Stadium between defending champions Leinster and Ulster. Leinster won the match 27–5 to defend their title and complete a hat-trick of title wins.

Route to the final

The top two sides from each of the two conferences met in the semi-finals, with the higher placed team having home advantage. Teams placed second and third in opposite conferences would have met in the two quarter-finals, but this was scrapped this year. The play-offs took place immediately following the final round of derby fixtures.

Semi-finals

Pre-match
The match was televised free-to-air by TG4 in the Republic of Ireland, and on BBC in Northern Ireland. It was also shown on Eir Sport.

Final

Summary

Details

Notes

References

2020
2019–20 Pro14
Pro14 Grand Final
Leinster Rugby matches
Ulster Rugby matches